Bob Dyce (born December 3, 1965) is the head coach and special teams coordinator for the Ottawa Redblacks of the Canadian Football League (CFL). He was formerly the interim head coach of the Saskatchewan Roughriders. He is a Grey Cup champion after winning as an assistant coach with the Roughriders in 2013 and with the Redblacks in 2016. He attended the University of Manitoba where he played wide receiver with the Manitoba Bisons.

Coaching career
After spending time as an assistant coach in the Canadian Junior Football League and Canadian Interuniversity Sport, Dyce first joined his hometown Winnipeg Blue Bombers as the team's wide receivers coach in 2003. He served in that capacity for seven years before joining the Saskatchewan Roughriders to serve as the passing game coordinator and receivers coach in 2010. He was promoted to offensive coordinator in 2012, but switched to special teams coordinator the following year. The change proved fruitful as Dyce and the Roughriders won the 101st Grey Cup in their home stadium in 2013. He was promoted to head coach on August 31, 2015, following the dismissal of Corey Chamblin after an 0–9 start to the season. Dyce finished with a 3–6 to end the season. He was then replaced as head coach of the Roughriders on December 7, 2015, by former Edmonton Eskimos head coach Chris Jones. On December 18, 2015, Dyce was named the special teams coordinator for the Ottawa Redblacks.

On October 3, 2022, Following the firing of head coach Paul LaPolice, Dyce was named the team's interim head coach. The Redblacks won their first match with Dyce in charge, defeating the Montreal Alouettes on October 9, 2022. The team would go on to lose its final three games and finish in last place with only four wins and 14 losses. On November 29, 2022, it was reported by TSN insider Farhan Lalji that Dyce was one of three finalists for the vacant Redblacks head coaching job. On December 2, the Redblacks removed the interim title and named Dyce as their next head coach.

CFL coaching record

References

External links
 Ottawa Redblacks bio

1965 births
Living people
Canadian football people from Winnipeg
University of Manitoba alumni
Manitoba Bisons football coaches
Winnipeg Blue Bombers coaches
Saskatchewan Roughriders coaches
Ottawa Redblacks coaches
Canadian football wide receivers
Players of Canadian football from Manitoba